Justin Deas (born March 30, 1948, in Connellsville, Pennsylvania) is an American actor. He is known primarily for his work on daytime soap operas.

Personal life
Deas received his Bachelor of Arts from the College of William & Mary. Deas married actress Margaret Colin (who played his onscreen wife on As the World Turns) in 1988; the couple has two sons. He has a daughter, Yvette Deas, with Jody Catlin.

Career
Deas' first daytime role was as Bucky on Ryan's Hope. He was the tenth actor to play the role of Tom Hughes on As the World Turns. He also played Keith Timmons on Santa Barbara, and Buzz Cooper on Guiding Light. He held the record for most Daytime Emmy Awards in the acting categories, winning six Emmys - (once for As the World Turns, twice for Santa Barbara and three times for Guiding Light) until 2012 when Anthony Geary won a seventh award in the same category.

Filmography
 1975-1978: Ryan's Hope as Dr. Bucky Carter (255 episodes)
 1980s: One Life to Live as Marco Dane (Temporary replacement for Gerald Anthony)
 1981-1984: As the World Turns as Tom Hughes #10  (Role: December 1980 to April 13, 1984)
 1985: Tales from the Darkside as Heat Jones (1 episode) in "False Prophet"
 1986: Dream Lover as Kevin McCann
 1986: Foley Square as N/A (1 episode)
 1986:  Intimate Strangers as Brad Bierston
 1986-1988: Santa Barbara as Keith Timmons (Role: May 30, 1986 to November 17, 1988)
 1987: Cameo by Night as Detective Bellflower
 1987:  A Stranger Waits as Mike Webber
 1987:  U.S. Marshals: Waco & Rhinehart as Milo Rhinehart
 1989: Studio 5-B as Jake Gallagher
 1990: Montana as Clyde
 1990: The Loves of Emma Bardac as Narrator (voice)
 1992: Szuler as Rudolf "Rudy" de Seve
 1993-2009: Guiding Light as Buzz Cooper (Role: February 5, 1993 – September 18, 2009)
 2010: An Affirmative Act as Governor Packer Winstroll

References

1948 births
Living people
20th-century American male actors
21st-century American male actors
American male soap opera actors
Daytime Emmy Award winners
Daytime Emmy Award for Outstanding Lead Actor in a Drama Series winners
Daytime Emmy Award for Outstanding Supporting Actor in a Drama Series winners
Male actors from Pennsylvania
People from Connellsville, Pennsylvania
College of William & Mary alumni